Dennis Joseph (20 October 1957 – 10 May 2021) was an Indian scriptwriter and director known for his work in Malayalam films. He was active during the 1980s and early 1990s. He frequently collaborated with directors Joshi and Thambi Kannanthanam. He is known for scripting films including Nirakkoottu (1985), Rajavinte Makan (1986), Shyama (1986), New Delhi (1987), No.20 Madras Mail (1990), Kottayam Kunjachan (1990), Indrajaalam (1990), Akashadoothu (1993), Palayam (1994), and F.I.R. (1999). He also directed five films, including Manu Uncle, which won the National Film Award for Best Children's Film in 1988 and the Kerala State Film Award for the Best Children's Film in 1989.

Early life
Dennis was born on 20 October 1957 in Ettumanoor, Kottayam, Kerala, India, to M. N. Joseph and Eliyamma Joseph. His father worked in the Indian Air Force, while his mother worked as a local teacher. However, he was also born into a film-making family, being a nephew of actors Jose Prakash and Prem Prakash. He was also the nephew to Francis Prakash, who would go on to be a producer of the 1974 film Shapamoksham. He attended the Ettumanoor Government High School, followed by Deva Matha College, Kuravilangad, where he studied for a BS.c. degree in chemistry.

Career
Dennis's career began at the Malayalam-language film magazine Cut Cut, where he worked as a sub-editor to the cartoonist B. M. Gafoor. During his stint at the magazine, he interviewed prominent actors in the Malayalam film industry, as well as spending time at filming locations. Dennis made his debut into cinema in 1985, as the scriptwriter for the Jeassy film Eeran Sandhya, a film which saw Mammootty star alongside Shobana, Rahman and Joseph's uncle Jose Prakash. He followed this by writing the screenplay for Nirakkoottu, also in 1985. Directed by Joshiy, Nirakkoottu, whose cast included Mammootty, Urvashi, Lizzy and Sumalatha, told the story of a prisoner who seeks revenge for his wife's murder.

Nirakkoottu was a success, leading Dennis to write a series of other films in the subsequent years. This included Rajavinte Makan, loosely adapted from Rage of Angels, a novel by Sidney Sheldon, which was released in 1986. Directed by Thampi Kannanthanam, this film was a huge success at the box office. Appearing as Vincent Gomas, a crime boss, Mohanlal successfully mesmerized the moviegoers and the film raised his stardom. Similarly, after around many flops, Mammootty was in the darkest days of his career in the period 1986–87, when Dennis scripted New Delhi. Directed by Joshiy, this film was also a loose adaptation of an English novel, Irving Wallace's The Almighty. Completely shot in and around Delhi, and went on to become the comeback film of Mammootty.

In 1988, Dennis made his directorial debut with critically acclaimed Manu Uncle starring Mammootty, and the film featured a comedic police officer played by Suresh Gopi. It won the National Film Award for Best Children's Film in 1988 and the Kerala State Film Award for the Best Children's Film in 1989.

Dennis continued writing scripts throughout the 1990s and 2000s; his last released film to date being 2013's Geethanjali, directed by Priyadarshan. He then took a hiatus from writing until 2020 when he announced a collaboration with director Omar Lulu on a film called Power Star.

Personal life and death
Dennis was married to Leena and had three children – Elizabeth, Rossy, and Jose.

He died on 10 May 2021, in Kottayam following a heart attack.

Filmography

As writer

As director

References

External links

1957 births
2021 deaths
Malayalam screenwriters
Malayalam film directors
People from Kottayam district
20th-century Indian film directors
Indian male screenwriters
Film directors from Kerala
Screenwriters from Kerala
20th-century Indian dramatists and playwrights
21st-century Indian dramatists and playwrights
20th-century Indian male writers
21st-century Indian male writers
Directors who won the Best Children's Film National Film Award